Jean-Luc Pepin,  (November 1, 1924 – September 5, 1995) was a Canadian academic, politician and Cabinet minister.

Political biography
Pepin was a political science professor at the University of Ottawa when he was first elected to the House of Commons of Canada in the 1963 election as a Liberal Member of Parliament (MP) from Quebec.

From 1965 to 1972, he served in the cabinets of Prime Ministers Lester B. Pearson and Pierre Trudeau in various capacities, including Minister of Mines and Minister of Industry, Trade and Commerce overseeing the decision to have Canada adopt the metric system.

He lost his seat in the 1972 election, and retired from public life until 1975 when Trudeau appointed him to chair the Anti-Inflation Board.

In 1977, he and former Premier of Ontario John Robarts were appointed to head the "Task Force on Canadian Unity". This task force was created by the federal government as a response to the election of the Parti Québécois, which seeks political independence for Quebec in the 1976 provincial election.

The task force issued a report in 1979 that recommended entrenching language rights in the Canadian Constitution, and for the reduction of federal powers in all areas but economic management. The Task Force also recommended the replacement of the Senate of Canada with a "Council of the Federation" whose members would be appointed by provincial governments, and to grant the provinces a say in appointments to the Supreme Court of Canada. Most of these recommendations were rejected by the Government of Canada, and did not make their way into the new Constitution that was enacted in 1982.

After a seven-year absence, Pepin returned to the House of Commons in the 1979 election. When the Liberals returned to power after the 1980 election, he became Minister of Transport until 12 August 1983. In that position he was responsible for
 the drastic 1981 passenger rail service cuts (from which Canadian passenger rail never recovered);
 abolition of the Crowsnest Pass rates;
 the National Ports Policy, enunciated in the Harbour Commissions Act.
Later, he became a Minister of State to the Department of External Affairs and Minister responsible for La Francophonie.

Later life

Following heart surgery, he retired from politics in 1984, and returned to academia as a fellow at the University of Ottawa's Institute on Public Policy.

In 1977, he was made a Companion of the Order of Canada.  He was bestowed the title, The Right Honourable in 1992.

Electoral history

	

|}

|-

|}
Note: Social Credit vote is compared to Ralliement créditiste vote in the 1968 election.

Bibliography

 Pepin, Jean-Luc, 1924–. National ports policy = Politique portuaire nationale / Jean-Luc Pepin. – [Ottawa] : Minister of Transport = Ministre des transports, 1981.

Archives 
There is a Jean-Luc Pepin fonds at Library and Archives Canada.

References

External links
 Order of Canada Citation
 
 Jean-Luc Pepin at The Canadian Encyclopedia

1924 births
1995 deaths
Canadian legal scholars
Canadian Ministers of Transport
Canadian political scientists
Companions of the Order of Canada
Liberal Party of Canada MPs
Members of the House of Commons of Canada from Ontario
Members of the House of Commons of Canada from Quebec
Members of the King's Privy Council for Canada
Politicians from Ottawa
People from Drummondville
French Quebecers
20th-century political scientists